David McPherson may refer to:

Dave McPherson (footballer) (born 1964), former Scottish international footballer
David McPherson (footballer) (1872–?), Scottish international footballer
Dave McPherson (musician) (born 1982), English rock musician
David McPherson (Paralympian), Australian Paralympic athlete
David Murdoch McPherson (1847–1915), Canadian farmer, manufacturer and political figure

See also
David Macpherson (disambiguation)